The Skatebirds (onscreen title: Skatebirds) is an American live-action/animated package program produced by Hanna-Barbera Productions and broadcast on CBS from September 10, 1977, to January 21, 1978.

Overview
The Skatebirds consisted of three large costumed birds on roller skates: Knock-Knock, a woodpecker (voiced by Lennie Weinrib); Satchel, a pelican (voiced by Bob Holt) and Scooter, a penguin (voiced by Don Messick). Their nemesis was a cat named Scat Cat (voiced by Scatman Crothers).

The live-action sequences featuring The Skatebirds mostly revolved around the nasty Scat Cat perpetually chasing the roller-skating trio and trying to get the best of them. Unlike the Banana Splits live-action segments, the Skatebirds were filmed in a variety of theme-park locations, rather than running around in a single studio.

The show was divided into four short segments introduced by live action wraparounds with The Skatebirds characters which included three animated segments (The Robonic Stooges, Wonder Wheels and Woofer & Wimper, Dog Detectives) and a 10-minute live-action segment (Mystery Island). The appearance of the characters and the show's format was similar to The Banana Splits. Unlike its similar predecessor and most Saturday morning children's shows produced in the 1970s, The Skatebirds did not contain a laugh track.

A total of 16 episodes of The Skatebirds were produced in its original run from September 10, 1977, to January 21, 1978. In the fall of 1979, the show returned to CBS in a shortened half-hour version with Wonder Wheels and Mystery Island segments (The Robonic Stooges and Woofer & Whimper, Dog Detectives segments had been spun off into a separate half-hour) and broadcast on Sunday mornings from September 9, 1979, until January 25, 1981. In the late 1980s, a different syndicated half-hour version of The Skatebirds with The Robonic Stooges and Wonder Wheels segments was shown on USA Cartoon Express and later resurfaced on Cartoon Network in the 1990s and Boomerang in the 2000s.

Opening and closing credits
The opening credits for the original one-hour version with voice-over narration by the show's recording director Wally Burr:
It's Skatebird time and here come The Skatebirds –SKATEBIRDS (C) 1977 HANNA BARBERA PRODUCTIONS INC.- Knock-Knock, Scooter, Satchel and Scat Cat. Then, The Robonic Stooges, plus the spine-tingling suspense-filled excitement of Mystery Island, and the doggone it daffy doings of those dog detectives, Woofer & Whimper, and more...the unbelievable adventures of an unbelievable motorcycle, Wonder Wheels. For all-out fun, it's Satch, Knock-Knock, Scooter and Scat Cat...and for suspense, mystery and adventure, it's The Skatebirds Show!

The opening credits for the syndicated half-hour version with voice-over narration by Ronnie Schell:
It's Skatebird time starring Knock-Knock, Satchel and Scooter, those featheared clowns of fantasy. Along with Willie the Wheeler and the superhero cycle known as Wonder Wheels, as well as those three mechanical marbles, The Robonic Stooges. One big collection of wild, wacky and wonderful characters...The Skatebirds!

The music featured in the closing credits is the CB Bears theme which was also later used as the ending credits for Captain Caveman and the Teen Angels.

Segments

The Robonic Stooges

The characters of The Three Stooges – Moe (voiced by Paul Winchell), Larry (voiced by Joe Baker) and Curly (voiced by Frank Welker) – as clumsy crime-fighting bionic superheroes who are given assignments via film projector from their boss Agent 000 (voiced by Ross Martin) who runs the Superhero Employment Agency.

Wonder Wheels

A high school journalist named Willie Wheeler (voiced by Micky Dolenz) and his girlfriend Dooley (voiced by Susan Davis) solve crimes with the help of his shape-shifting superhero motorcycle Wonder Wheels. Whenever Willie goes into action, his beat-up motorcycle transforms itself into a flashy version with a mind of its own.

Woofer & Wimper, Dog Detectives

A shortened and re-titled version of Clue Club featuring two talking bloodhounds – Woofer & Wimper (voiced by Paul Winchell and Jim MacGeorge) – who help solve mysteries with the Clue Club detectives: Larry (voiced by David Jolliffe), Pepper (voiced by Patricia Stitch), D.D. (voiced by Bob Hastings), and Dottie (voiced by Tara Talboy) which usually ends with the bad guys arrested by Sheriff Bagley (voiced by John Stephenson). The original half-hour episodes of Clue Club were cut-down to 10 minutes to showcase both dogs as the show's main characters.

Mystery Island

The adventures of a plane crew consisting of pilot Chuck Kelly (portrayed by Stephen Parr), computer expert Sue Corwin (portrayed by Lynn Marie Johnston), her younger brother Sandy (portrayed by Larry Volk), and their robot named P.O.P.S. (voiced by Frank Welker) who stranded on a remote island by the evil scientist Dr. Strange (portrayed by Michael Kermoyan) after he used a tractor beam to bring their airplane down onto Mystery Island. Dr. Strange hopes to capture P.O.P.S. and use it in his quest for world domination.

Broadcast history
Original CBS broadcast:
 CBS Saturday Morning: September 10, 1977 – January 21, 1978
 CBS Sunday Morning: September 9, 1979 – August 31, 1980 (rebroadcast)
 CBS Sunday Morning: September 7, 1980 – January 25, 1981 (rebroadcast)

Broadcast schedules (all EDT):
 September 10, 1977 – November 12, 1977, CBS Saturday 9:30-10:30 AM
 November 19, 1977 – January 21, 1978, CBS Saturday 8:00-9:00 AM
 September 9, 1979 – March 1980, CBS Sunday 7:30-8:00 AM
 March 1980 – August 31, 1980, CBS Sunday 7:00-7:30 AM
 September 7, 1980 – January 25, 1981, CBS Sunday 8:00-8:30 AM

Skatebirds cast

Production credits
 DIRECTED BY: Sidney Miller ("Skatebirds" segments), Hollingsworth Morse ("Mystery Island" segments)
 WRITTEN BY: Sid Morse, Norman Camaron ("Skatebirds" segments)
 PRODUCED BY: Terry Morse, Jr.
 DIRECTOR OF PHOTOGRAPHY: Dennis Dalzell
 CAMERAMAN: Gabriel Torres
 SUPERVISING FILM EDITOR: Dick Elliott
 EDITORS: Peter Berger, Warner Leighton, Peter Jennings
 ASSISTANT FILM EDITOR: Barry Gold
 MUSIC EDITORS: Joe Sandusky, Ken Hall
 EFFECTS EDITORS: Gregory Watson, Terry Moore, Evelyn Rutledge, Rich Harrison, Cliff Kohlweck
 COSTUME COORDINATOR: Charles De Moth
 MAKE UP ARTIST: Robert Norin
 SET DECORATOR: Leonard Mazzola
 PROPERTY MASTERS: William Diets, William Hudson
 "ROBONIC STOOGES" CREATED BY: Norman Maurer
 STORY EDITORS: Norman Maurer, Sid Morse
 STORY: Kathy Colburn, Tom Dagenais, Bill Daley, Dianne Dixon, Kari Oaurs, Andy Heyward, Chris Jenkyns, Mark Jones, Joan Maurer, Michael Maurer, Norman Maurer, Jack Mendelsohn, Howie Post, Cliff Roberts, Sandy Sandifer
 STORY DIRECTION: Alvaro Arce, Carl Fallberg, Cullen Houghtaling, Mike O'Connor, Don Sheppard, George Singer, Karran Wright
 RECORDING DIRECTOR: Wally Burr
 VOICES: Joe E. Baker, Wally Burr, Henry Corden, Scatman Crothers, Susan Davis, Micky Dolenz, Ron Feinberg, Joan Gerber, Virginia Gregg, Bob Hastings, Bob Holt, Jane James, Ralph James, Casey Kasem, David Jolliffe, Jim MacGeorge, Ross Martin, Julie McWhirter, Allan Melvin, Don Messick, Marvin Miller, Alan Oppenheimer, Vic Perrin, Robert Ridgely, Ken Sansom, Ronnie Schell, Hal Smith, John Stephenson, Patricia Stitch, Tara Talboy, Janet Waldo, Lennie Weinrib, Frank Welker, Paul Winchell
 GRAPHICS: Iraj Paran
 MUSICAL DIRECTION: Hoyt Curtin
 MUSICAL SUPERVISION: Paul DeKorte
 CHARACTER DESIGN: Bob Singer, Norman Maurer, Lew Ott, George Wheeler
 SPECIAL GRAPHICS DESIGN: Maria Dail, Dick Ung
 LAYOUT SUPERVISION: Steve Lumley
 LAYOUT: Bob Fosbry, Terry Moesker, Joe Shearer, Mike Trebert
 BACKGROUNDS: Richard Zaloudek, Milan Zahorsky, Jerry Liew, Michael King-Prince, Peter Connell, Ken Wright, Michael Chojecki, Lesley Nicholl
 ANIMATION: Sue Speak, Cecil Collins, Rodney D'Silva, Dick Dunn, Peter Eastment, John Ellis, Warwick Gilbert, Gerald Grabner, Sebastian Hurpia, Greg Ingram, Richard Jones, Cynthia Leech, Paul McAdam, Henry Neville, Ray Nowland, Di Rudder, Michael Stapleton, John Tych, Kaye Watts
 ASSISTANT ANIMATION SUPERVISION: Paul Maron
 ANIMATION CHECKING: Narelle Nixon
 XEROGRAPHY: Ellen Bayley
 INK AND PAINT SUPERVISION: Narelle Derrick
 PRODUCTION MANAGERS: R.J. Louis, James Cranston
 PRODUCTION COORDINATOR: Tobi Singleton
 PRODUCTION SUPERVISION: Doug Patterson, Mark D'Arcy-Irvine, Adrienne Smith
 ART DIRECTOR: Kirk Axtell
 ASSISTANT DIRECTORS: Marie Gisneros, Murray Schwartz
 SECOND ASSISTANT DIRECTOR: Hal Bell
 SCRIPT SUPERVISORS: Mary Jane Ferguson, Lester Hoyle
 SOUND DIRECTION: Richard Olson, Bill Getty
 SOUND MIXERS: Manuel Topoto, James Pilcher
 ANIMATION PHOTOGRAPHY: Terry Smith, Carole Laird, Mark D'Arcy-Irvine, Kieren Mulgrew, Tom Epperson
 DUBBING SUPERVISION: Pat Foley
 NEGATIVE CONSULTANT: William E. DeBoer
 POST PRODUCTION SUPERVISION: Joed Eaton
 ANIMATION DIRECTORS: Charles A. Nichols, Chris Cuddington
 CREATIVE PRODUCER: Iwao Takamoto
 ASSOCIATE PRODUCER: Neil Balnaves
 EXECUTIVE PRODUCERS: Joseph Barbera and William Hanna

Other appearances
 The Skatebirds made a special guest appearance at a celebrity roast honoring Fred Flintstone in the TV special Hanna-Barbera's All-Star Comedy Ice Revue (1978).

Merchandise
 A board game based on The Skatebirds was released by Milton Bradley in 1978. It was a 2–3 player game suited for children between 7–12 years of age. The board also featured the characters of Woofer and Wimper (with the Clue Club teenagers and Sheriff Bagley) and The Robonic Stooges. The game's premise was The Skatebirds are trying to organize their TV show and Scat Cat does all he can to foul up their plans: he has built a marble slide at the Treehouse and does his best to stop The Skatebirds. The first player to reach the Skatebirds' Treehouse Studio wins the game.
 A coloring book, Skatebirds Present The Robonic Stooges, was released by Rand McNally in 1978.

References

External links
 
 
 The Skatebirds at Hollywood.com

1977 American television series debuts
1978 American television series endings
1970s American animated television series
1970s American anthology television series
1970s American children's comedy television series
American children's animated anthology television series
American children's animated comedy television series
American television series with live action and animation
American television shows featuring puppetry
CBS original programming
English-language television shows
Television series by Hanna-Barbera
Hanna-Barbera characters
Crossover animated television series
Television series about birds
Television series by Warner Bros. Television Studios